The 1996 NCAA Division II football season, part of college football in the United States organized by the National Collegiate Athletic Association at the Division II level, began on September 7, 1996, and concluded with the NCAA Division II Football Championship on December 14, 1996, at Braly Municipal Stadium in Florence, Alabama, hosted by the University of North Alabama. The Northern Colorado Bears defeated the Carson–Newman, 23–14, to win their first Division II national title.

The Harlon Hill Trophy was awarded to Jarrett Anderson, running back from Truman.

Conference and program changes

Conference changes

Program changes
After East Texas State University joined the Texas A&M University System in 1996 and changed its name to Texas A&M University–Commerce, the East Texas State Lions became the Texas A&M–Commerce Lions.
After Northeast Missouri State University changed its name to Truman State University in 1996, the Northeast Missouri State Bulldogs became the Truman Bulldogs.

Conference standings

Conference summaries

Postseason

The 1996 NCAA Division II Football Championship playoffs were the 23rd single-elimination tournament to determine the national champion of men's NCAA Division II college football. The championship game was held at Braly Municipal Stadium in Florence, Alabama, for the tenth time.

Playoff bracket

See also
 1996 NCAA Division I-A football season
 1996 NCAA Division I-AA football season
 1996 NCAA Division III football season
 1996 NAIA Division I football season
 1996 NAIA Division II football season

References